Thacker Mines is an unincorporated community and coal town located in Mingo County, West Virginia. Their post office  has been closed.

References 

Unincorporated communities in West Virginia
Unincorporated communities in Mingo County, West Virginia
Coal towns in West Virginia